Kim Jung-seung (born October 22, 1986), better known by his stage name Chancellor, is an American singer-songwriter and record producer. Born in Seoul, his family immigrated to the United States in his youth where he lived until returning to South Korea in 2009. He debuted in the trio One Way the following year, which found little success. He partnered with Park Jang-geun to form the songwriting and production duo Duble Sidekick, which garnered success from 2012. Chancellor left the team two years later to pursue a solo career. He released his debut studio album My Full Name in 2016.

Life and career
Chancellor was born Kim Jung-seung on October 22, 1986, in Seoul, South Korea. He is the son of former Songgolmae bassist Kim Sang-bok. His family immigrated to Los Angeles, California, when he was five or six years old, where his father managed a restaurant. Influenced by his father's musical background, Chancellor took interest in music and enjoyed rapping, singing, and playing the drums. He began teaching himself about mixing and using audio editing software in high school. He attended Berklee College of Music in Boston and majored in Contemporary Writing and Production, where he studied composition and arrangement. Chancellor met rapper Young Sky in the United States, who had met vocalist Peter while living in Australia. Chancellor returned to South Korea in 2009. All three were pursuing music careers in the country, where Chancellor met Peter. Upon discovering their similar tastes in music, they formed the R&B and hip-hop group One Way. With Chancellor bearing responsibility for their lyrics and music compositions as Chance, the trio released their debut mini-album One Way Street and its lead single "Magic" through Yejeon Media in March 2010. He also provided guitar and piano on three tracks.

Chancellor and Park Jang-geun met after being introduced to each other by DMTN's Daniel. Park suggested collaborating with Chancellor after listening to one of his tracks; the pair formed the songwriting and production team Duble Sidekick. Chancellor adopted the name Mikey, and worked on composing and arranging music. He also served as the vice president of Duble Kick Entertainment. In the first half of 2012, the duo were listed within the top ten "hit makers" among musicians registered with the Korea Music Copyright Association. Due to his commitments with Duble Sidekick, Chancellor stepped away from his role in One Way and the group continued with the remaining two members. In an interview with daily newspaper No Cut News, he cited the trio's poor commercial performance and "not seeing a future" as his reasons for leaving the group. He remained contractually bound to Yejeon Media, which inhibited him from releasing his own music.

Following the expiration of his contract with the agency in 2014, Chancellor parted ways with Duble Sidekick to pursue a solo singing career. In 2015, Chancellor competed in the eleventh season of the singing competition series King of Mask Singer, but was eliminated in a 40–59 vote. Under his current stage name, he released his debut single "Son E Ga" on September 8. He signed with Brand New Music the following year and released his debut studio album My Full Name and its lead single "Surrender" with Lyn on November 30, 2016. After signing with Konnect Entertainment two months prior, his self-titled second studio album and the singles "Midnight" and "Runaway with Me" were released on October 13, 2021. The former was included in Billboard magazine's "25 Best K-pop Songs of 2021: Critics' Picks", while Chancellor himself was included in Tidal's list of "K-pop: Artists To Watch in 2022".

Personal life
Chancellor is an American citizen. He began dating singer NS Yoon-G in March 2015 while working on music together. They had met two years prior to the relationship. The couple became estranged due to their conflicting schedules and ended their relationship in August 2017.

On October 21, 2022, Chancellor announced he would marry his non-celebrity girlfriend on October 29.

Discography

Albums

Studio albums

Singles

As lead artist

As featured artist

Guest appearances

Soundtrack appearances

Filmography

Notes

References

1986 births
21st-century American singers
American contemporary R&B singers
American expatriates in South Korea
American hip hop singers
American male singer-songwriters
American people of South Korean descent
American record producers
Berklee College of Music alumni
Brand New Music artists
Konnect Entertainment artists
Living people
Singers from Los Angeles
Singer-songwriters from California